Morten Haga Lunde (born 20 December 1960) is a Norwegian military officer.

He graduated from the Norwegian Air Force Academy in 1987, and from the NATO Defense College in 2002. He was appointed head of Norwegian Joint Headquarters in 2013, with the rank of lieutenant general.

In 2015 he was appointed head of the Norwegian Intelligence Service. He received the Nynorsk User of the Year award in 2017.

References

External links

1960 births
Living people
Royal Norwegian Air Force Academy alumni
NATO Defense College alumni
Royal Norwegian Air Force generals